Pacquiao: The Movie is a 2006 Philippine biographical action drama film directed by Joel C. Lamangan. The film stars Jericho Rosales as the title role. The film is based on a true story of Filipino boxer Emmanuel "Manny" Pacquiao. The film was shot in General Santos, Manila and Los Angeles, California.

This is FLT Films' only film after a 3-year hiatus, which in turn would be the last film produced. With the film being a box office bomb, plans of a two-picture contract for Pacquiao didn't push through.

Pacquiao: The Movie would be followed 9 years later by Kid Kulafu, which focuses on the boxer's early years as a childhood and youth.

Plot
The film starts with the opening credits with clips from the first fight between Manny Pacquiao and Érik Morales. After which, it started when a beaten Manny (Jericho Rosales) depressed upon his defeat to Morales. He was with his trainer Buboy Fernandez (Bayani Agbayani) and his wife Jinkee (Bea Alonzo). After that, the scene flashes back to a young Manny (Jiro Manio) being experienced as a boxer in General Santos. It comes back to the present time when Manny was hospitalized. It comes back to his childhood with his strict mother Dionesia (Jaclyn Jose) whose having a misunderstanding with her husband Rosalio (Tirso Cruz III) and he started his training as a young boxer. Then it goes back to the time when Manny is planning to go back to the Philippines.

After that it flashes back to Manny as a boxer, there he met Nanay Parcon (Gloria Sevilla), a recruiter of young boxers and Emong Dionisio (Jay Manalo). Her mother disagrees with Manny's decision to be a boxer because he is too young. After that, it comes back to the present time, when Manny and his team arrived in the Philippines. It flashes back again when he went to Manila to be a boxer. He lived in a gym in Malabon owned by Polding Correa (Ricky Davao). Emong saw Manny and began his dream as a boxer. He worked in a construction and selling sampaguita. It goes back when he arrived at his home with his family greeting him even though he lost. It flashes back when Manny began his journey as a boxer. At seventeen years old, he became a professional, and he was undefeated at that time. He was handled eventually by Ruben Novales (Tony Mabesa). He arrived at General Santos and hired Buboy Fernandez, his close friend as his trainer. There he learned that her parents were separated. His undefeated streak ended when he was knocked-out by Rustico Torrecampo. There, his close friend Eugene Barutag (Biboy Ramirez) collapsed and died after a grueling fight.

In present time, he learned also that Emong is using Manny's name for his ventures. Emong is now poor, and it flashes back when he was a boxer, he was hit by a car and was hospitalized. In a mall, he met Jinkee Jamora. Jinkee had a twin sister, Janet but her mother is confused about Manny. Manny and Jinkee married in a civil wedding. Dionesia disagrees with his wife. In Thailand, Manny is the Flyweight champion, he lost to Medgoen Singsurat. There, he became addicted to drugs and became a womanizer. After that, he changed and never used drugs again. Manny's victories became a hit. One of which when he won over Marco Antonio Barrera. However, Jinkee learned that he had a child out-of-wedlock. The scene goes back upon the controversial fight between Pacquiao and Morales. In the end, the two had their rematch where Manny won via a 10-Round Technical Knock-Out. The movie ended when Manny was given a Hero's Welcome and some clips of the real Pacquiao and his motorcade.

Cast and characters

See also
 Manny (film)
 Kid Kulafu

References

External links 
 
 Pacquiao: The Movie at Star Cinema

2006 films
Philippine boxing films
Philippine action films
2000s Tagalog-language films
Star Cinema films
FLT Films films
Biographical films about sportspeople
Cultural depictions of boxers
Manny Pacquiao
Sports films based on actual events
Philippine films based on actual events
Films directed by Joel Lamangan
Cultural depictions of Manny Pacquiao